Boyhood: Scenes from Provincial Life is a fictionalised autobiographical work by J. M. Coetzee, and focuses on his years spent growing up in South Africa. The novel focuses on his troubled time in Worcester but looks back to happier times living in a large house in Rosebank, Cape Town. By the end of the novel they had moved again, this time to Plumstead, Cape Town.

1997 novels
20th-century South African novels
Autobiographical novels
Novels by J. M. Coetzee
Novels set in Cape Town
Secker & Warburg books